Zhudong railway station is a railway station located in Zhudong Township, Hsinchu County, Taiwan. It is located on the Neiwan line and is operated by the Taiwan Railways Administration.

Around the station
 Zhudong Animation and Comic Creative Park
 Zhudong Timber Industry Exhibition Hall

References

1947 establishments in Taiwan
Railway stations opened in 1947
Railway stations in Hsinchu County
Railway stations served by Taiwan Railways Administration